Pšata is a village in the Municipality of Cerklje na Gorenjskem in the Upper Carniola region of Slovenia.

Church

The local church is dedicated to Mary Magdalene. It was built in 1738, on the site of an earlier church.

References

External links

Pšata on Geopedia

Populated places in the Municipality of Cerklje na Gorenjskem